Walter Francis "Lefty" Wolf (June 10, 1900 – September 25, 1971) was a professional baseball pitcher. He appeared in eight games in Major League Baseball in 1921 with the Philadelphia Athletics.

External links

Major League Baseball pitchers
Philadelphia Athletics players
Indianapolis Indians players
Quincy Indians players
Lebanon Valley Flying Dutchmen baseball players
Baseball players from Hartford, Connecticut
1900 births
1971 deaths